The  was a golf tournament on the Japan Golf Tour from 2000 to 2012. The tournament record was 269 (19 under par), set by Christian Pena, Brendan Jones and Naomichi Ozaki in 2002; Pena won the title in a playoff. In its final year, in 2012, it was played in late July and the prize fund was ￥150,000,000 with ￥30,000,000 going to the winner.

Tournament hosts

Winners

References

External links
Coverage on the Japan Golf Tour's official site

Former Japan Golf Tour events
Defunct golf tournaments in Japan
Sport in Hokkaido
Recurring sporting events established in 2000
Recurring sporting events disestablished in 2012
2000 establishments in Japan
2012 disestablishments in Japan